The Niagara Purple Eagles represent Niagara University in College Hockey America. The Purple Eagles attempted to qualify for the NCAA tournament for the second time in school history.

Offseason
August 23: Head coach Chris MacKenzie has resigned as the head coach of the Purple Eagles. Assistant coach Josh Sciba has been named interim head coach for the 2011-12 season.

Recruiting

Regular season

Standings

Schedule

Awards and honors
 Kalli Funk, CHA Rookie of the Week (Week of November 7, 2011)
Kalli Funk, CHA Rookie of the Week (Week of January 31, 2011) 
 Kelsey Gunn, CHA Rookie of the Week (Week of January 16, 2012) 
 Jenna Hendrikx, CHA Player of the Week (Week of October 3, 2011)
Delaney Middlebrook, CHA Rookie of the Week (Week of October 3, 2011)
Sarah Moses, CHA Defensive Player of the Week (Week of November 21, 2011)
Sarah Moses, CHA Defensive Player of the Week (Week of January 23, 2012)
Erica Owczarczak, CHA Player of the Week (Week of November 7, 2011)
Kayla Raniwsky, CHA Rookie of the Week, (Week of January 23, 2012)
Kayla Raniwsky, CHA Rookie of the Week, (Week of February 27, 2012)
Abby Ryplanski, CHA Defensive Player of the Week (Week of October 24, 2011)
Abby Ryplanski, CHA Defensive Player of the Week (Week of November 7, 2011)
 Kelsey Welch, Niagara University Student Athlete of the Week (Week of October 17, 2011)

References

Niagara Purple Eagles women's ice hockey seasons
Niagara
Niagara Purple Eagles men's basketball
Niagara Purple Eagles men's basketball